The Authenticity Party (ḥizb el-asala) is one of the political parties created in Egypt after the 2011 Egyptian Revolution. It has an ultra-conservative Islamist Salafist ideology, which believes in implementing strict Sharia law. The party was formed by the former head of the Virtue Party, General Adel Abdel Maksoud; he left the Virtue Party after allegedly discovering a plot which changed the moderate principles of the party. The party is considering leaving the Anti-Coup Alliance.

In the 2011–12 Egypt parliamentary elections, the Authenticity party ran on the platform of the Islamist Bloc led by Al-Nour Party, another Salafist party. The Islamist Bloc received 7,534,266 votes out of a total 27,065,135 correct votes (27.8%). The Islamist Bloc gained 127 of the 498 parliamentary seats contested, second-place after the Muslim Brotherhood's Freedom and Justice Party. The Authenticity Party received 3 of these 127 seats.

Lawsuit against Islamic parties 
The Authenticity Party is one of the eleven Islamic parties targeted by a lawsuit in November 2014, when an organization named Popular Front for opposing the Brotherhoodization of Egypt sought to dissolve all political parties established "on a religious basis." The Alexandria Urgent Matters Court however ruled on 26 November 2014 that it lacked jurisdiction.

See also 
 List of political parties in Egypt

References

2011 establishments in Egypt
Conservative parties in Egypt
Islamic political parties in Egypt
Political parties established in 2011
Political parties in Egypt
Far-right political parties
Salafi groups
Sunni Islamic political parties